Daniel Lawrence Dercher (born June 2, 1976) is a former American football offensive tackle who played for the San Francisco 49ers of the National Football League (NFL). He played college football at University of Kansas.

References 

1976 births
Living people
People from Kansas City, Kansas
Players of American football from Kansas
American football offensive tackles
Kansas Jayhawks football players
San Francisco 49ers players